Anneliese Kapp (2 December 1908 – 8 October 1972) was a German diver. She competed in the women's 10 metre platform event at the 1936 Summer Olympics.

References

External links
 

1908 births
1972 deaths
German female divers
Olympic divers of Germany
Divers at the 1936 Summer Olympics
Sportspeople from Frankfurt
European Aquatics Championships medalists in swimming
20th-century German women